Michael Zapruder (born 1969 in Washington, D.C.) is an American musician and songwriter. He is a recording artist, and a co-founder of San Francisco's Howells Transmitter arts collective and record label.

Origins
Michael Zapruder was born in Washington, D.C. and grew up in Chevy Chase, Maryland. He is an alumnus of Bethesda-Chevy Chase High School and Hamilton College, where he studied religion and music. He spent his junior year of college living in Nepal, studying Tibetan language and religion. Upon graduating, Zapruder moved to the San Francisco Bay Area, where he now lives. His siblings are both writers, Matthew Zapruder and Alexandra Zapruder.

Initially self-taught in music, Zapruder has studied musicianship and theory at UC Berkeley and guitar, piano, voice and composition with private teachers, and holds an M.A. in music composition from California State University East Bay. He has performed and toured the U.S.

52 Songs
In 1999, Zapruder wrote, recorded and posted a song each week for a year, calling the project 52 Songs. During the year, Zapruder released a 5-song EP entitled Lomograph, and the following year assembled a compilation of songs from the project with the working title Bye Bye Beauty, which was never released. A few hundred CD copies of the full 52 Songs project were pressed and sold out and are now out of print.

This is a Beautiful Town
After completing 52 Songs, Zapruder taught himself piano and recorded the largely piano-based This is a Beautiful Town. The piano parts for the album were recorded on Neil Young's piano at his Broken Arrow Ranch. Zapruder began touring after the completion of this recording, covering the US three times in two years.

New Ways of Letting Go
In the mid-2000s, Zapruder and some close allies created the Howells Transmitter collective and record label, through which Zapruder released New Ways of Letting Go, an orchestral folk album with a large ensemble called Rain of Frogs. The album was recorded partly by Zapruder and his studio partner Jon Bernson, and finished in collaboration with Scott Solter. Zapruder toured widely for this release, including appearances at South by Southwest and Pop Montreal.

Dragon Chinese Cocktail Horoscope
In 2009, Zapruder again teamed up with Scott Solter for a two-week session at John Vanderslice's Tiny Telephone studio, during which the album, Dragon Chinese Cocktail Horoscope was recorded and mixed in its entirety. Released by SideCho Records, Dragon Chinese Cocktail Horoscope won the 2009 Independent Music Award for Best Folk/Singer-Songwriter Album. For the release, Zapruder teamed up with video director Jesse Ewles to produce a video for "Ads for Feelings".

Pink Thunder
In 2010, Zapruder completed work on the Pink Thunder project. Pink Thunder is a collection of free verse pop art-songs made from the poems of more than twenty contemporary American poets. Contributors include Noelle Kocot, James Tate, Bob Hicok, David Berman, D. A. Powell, and Valzhyna Mort. Zapruder composed, produced and sang on the recordings, which feature instrumental contributions from more than forty other musicians, including Nate Brenner from Tune-Yards, Ava Mendoza, Marc Capelle, and Tom Griesser.

Pink Thunder is available in multiple formats. Black Ocean Books published a hand-lettered hardcover book with enclosed CD. The Kora Records released a vinyl 12" version of the record containing eighteen of the pieces. Howells Transmitter and Black Ocean Books jointly released a pink vinyl 7" containing four of the pieces. Twenty-two Pink Thunder portmanteaus were available for listening, viewing and for sale at San Francisco's Curiosity Shoppe from October 18, 2012 to November 18, 2012. Consequence called Pink Thunder "a mixed bag of free verse poems backed with eccentric instrumentation."

Pink Thunder Portmanteaus
At the 2011 AWP conference in Washington DC, Zapruder debuted his portmanteaus, a multimedia release format for some of the Pink Thunder recordings. In collaboration with electronic designer Mark Allen-Piccolo, Zapruder embedded single tracks from the Pink Thunder project into ten identical pink plinth bases, on top of which rest found objects representing some aspect from the poems to which they correspond. These objects were hosted by ten participating publishers at the conference.

1924 Franklin is a Car
Since 2004, Zapruder has shared a small recording studio with songwriter Jon Bernson called 1924 Franklin is a Car. This space has been the main location for many recording projects and the site of many impromptu sessions. Other recording credits for the studio include work with Scott Pinkmountain, Black Fiction, The Lovely Public, Gene V. Baker, Anamude, P.A.F and Raised By Spacemen.

Howells Transmitter
Zapruder is a founding member of the Howells Transmitter arts collaborative and record label. Other principal members include Jennifer Welch, John Bernson and Colin Held. Howells Transmitter is home to a stylistically diverse group of artists: Charles Atlas, The Fresh and Onlys, Michael Zapruder's Rain of Frogs, Black Fiction, Scott Pinkmountain, Window Twins, Ray's Vast Basement, Modular Set and contributors to the Wiretap Music Compilation. Howells Transmitter has produced numerous plays and poetry readings, in addition to its musical endeavors.

Pandora
Michael Zapruder was Pandora's head music curator from 2003-2011. In 2012, he left Pandora to focus on music full-time.

References

External links
Michael Zapruder
Poetry Society of America Interview and Feature on Pink Thunder
Pitchfork Review of "Dragon Chinese Cocktail Horoscope"
Washington Post Review of "This is a Beautiful Town"
Popmatters review of "Dragon Chinese Cocktail Horoscope"
Said the Gramophone review from "New Ways of Letting Go"
Pink Thunder portmanteaus at AWP 2011
[ AllMusic]

1969 births
Living people
American male singer-songwriters
American indie rock musicians
American rock guitarists
Independent Music Awards winners
Singer-songwriters from Washington, D.C.